Anthony Ashley may refer to:

Sir Anthony Ashley, 1st Baronet (1551–1628), MP and clerk of the Privy Council
Evelyn Ashley (Anthony Evelyn Melbourne Ashley, 1836–1907), British author and politician

See also
Anthony Ashley-Cooper (disambiguation)